The 2020 First Responder Bowl was a college football bowl game played on December 26, 2020, with kickoff at 3:30 p.m. EST (2:30 p.m. local CST) on ABC. It was the 11th edition of the First Responder Bowl, and was one of the 2020–21 bowl games concluding the 2020 FBS football season. Sponsored by fire and water cleanup and restoration company Servpro, the game was officially known as the Servpro First Responder Bowl.

Teams
Based on conference tie-ins, the First Responder Bowl was expected to feature teams from the American Athletic Conference (AAC), Atlantic Coast Conference (ACC), or the Big 12 Conference. The announced contest matches Louisiana of the Sun Belt Conference against UTSA of Conference USA (C-USA). This was the first meeting of the two programs.

Louisiana Ragin' Cajuns

Louisiana accepted their bid to the First Responder Bowl on December 20, 2020. The Ragin' Cajuns entered the bowl with a record of 9–1 (7–1 in conference play) and ranked 16th in the AP Poll. Their only loss of the season was to Coastal Carolina, who they were due to face in a rematch in the Sun Belt Championship Game, but it was cancelled due to COVID-19 effects within the Coastal Carolina program.

UTSA Roadrunners

UTSA accepted their bid to the First Responder Bowl on December 15, 2020. The Roadrunners had originally accepted a bid to play SMU in the Frisco Bowl, but that game was canceled due to COVID-19 problems at SMU. The Roadrunners entered the bowl with a record of 7–4 (5–2 in conference play). They faced one ranked team during the season, losing to BYU in October.

During the week prior to the game, UTSA head coach Jeff Traylor tested positive for COVID-19, and thus did not accompany the team to Dallas. Associate head coach and offensive coordinator Barry Lunney Jr. served as the Roadrunners' coach for the game.

Game summary

Statistics

Notes

References

External links

Game statistics at statbroadcast.com

First Responder Bowl
First Responder Bowl
First Responder Bowl
First Responder Bowl
Louisiana Ragin' Cajuns football bowl games
UTSA Roadrunners football bowl games